Miyan Ab-e Shomali Rural District is a rural district (dehestan) in the Central District of Shushtar County, Khuzestan Province, Iran. At the 2006 census, its population was 22,341, in 4,285 families.  The rural district has 26 villages.

References 

Rural Districts of Khuzestan Province
Shushtar County